Hannah Vogt (3 March 1910, Berlin – 13 February 1994, Göttingen) was a German historian who wrote the best-selling book The Burden of Guilt: A Short History of Germany, 1914-1945.  It was first published in Germany in 1961 and sold 400,000 copies in the first two years.

Bibliography
 The Burden of Guilt: A Short History of Germany, 1914–1945, Hannah Vogt, Verrlag Moritz, 1961

References
 http://www.gedenkstaette-moringen.de/geschichte/maenner/schutzhaft/schutzhaft.html

1910 births
1994 deaths
20th-century German historians
20th-century German women writers
German women historians
Officers Crosses of the Order of Merit of the Federal Republic of Germany